The 2016–17 Old Dominion Monarchs women’s basketball team represents Old Dominion University during the 2016–17 NCAA Division I women's basketball season. The Monarchs, led by sixth year head coach Karen Barefoot, played their home games at Ted Constant Convocation Center as members of Conference USA.

Roster

Rankings

*First place votes in parenthesis
*AP does not release post-tournament rankings

Schedule

|-
!colspan=12 style=| Exhibition

|-
!colspan=12 style=|Non-conference regular season

|-
!colspan=12 style=| C-USA regular season

|-
!colspan=12 style=| C-USA Tournament

See also
2016–17 Old Dominion Monarchs men's basketball team

References

Old Dominion Monarchs women's basketball seasons
Old Dominion